The following outline is provided as an overview of and topical guide to Suriname:

Suriname – sovereign state on the northeastern Atlantic coast of South America, and the smallest country on that continent. It was long inhabited by indigenous tribal peoples with diverse cultures, before being explored and contested by European powers from the 16th century, and eventually coming under Dutch rule in the late 17th century. In 1954, the country became one of the constituent countries of the Kingdom of the Netherlands. On 25 November 1975, the country of Suriname left the Kingdom of the Netherlands to become an independent state, while maintaining close economic, diplomatic, and cultural ties to its former colonizer. Suriname is the only sovereign nation outside Europe where Dutch is spoken by a majority of the population.

General reference 

 Common English country name:  Suriname
 Official English country name:  The Republic of Suriname
 Common endonym(s):  
 Official endonym(s):  
 Adjectival(s): Surinamese
 Demonym(s): Surinamese
 Etymology: From "Surinen", an indigenous people who inhabited the area at the time of European contact.
 ISO country codes:  SR, SUR, 740
 ISO region codes:  See ISO 3166-2:SR
 Internet country code top-level domain:  .sr

Geography of Suriname 

Geography of Suriname
 Suriname is: a country
 Location:
 Northern Hemisphere
 Western Hemisphere
 South America
 Time zone:  UTC-03
 Extreme points of Suriname
 High:  Juliana Top 
 Low:  North Atlantic Ocean 0 m
 Land boundaries:  1,703 km
 600 km
 593 km
 510 km
 Coastline:  North Atlantic Ocean 386 km
 Population of Suriname: 534,000  - 168th most populous country

 Area of Suriname: 163,821 km2
 Atlas of Suriname

Environment of Suriname 

 Climate of Suriname
 Protected areas of Suriname
 Wildlife of Suriname
 Fauna of Suriname
 Birds of Suriname
 Mammals of Suriname

Natural geographic features of Suriname 

 Islands of Suriname
 Rivers of Suriname
 World Heritage Sites in Suriname

Regions of Suriname 

Regions of Suriname

Ecoregions of Suriname 

List of ecoregions in Suriname

Administrative divisions of Suriname 

Administrative divisions of Suriname
 Districts of Suriname

Districts of Suriname 

Districts of Suriname
Brokopondo
Commewijne
Coronie
Marowijne
Nickerie
Para
Paramaribo
Saramacca
Sipaliwini
Wanica

Demography of Suriname 

Demographics of Suriname

Government and politics of Suriname 

Politics of Suriname
 Form of government: unitary parliamentary representative democratic republic
 Capital of Suriname: Paramaribo
 Elections in Suriname
 Political parties in Suriname

Branches of the government of Suriname 

Government of Suriname

Executive branch of the government of Suriname 
 Head of state and head of government: President of Suriname, Chan Santokhi

Legislative branch of the government of Suriname 
 Parliament of Suriname: National Assembly (unicameral)

Judicial branch of the government of Suriname 

Court system of Suriname
 Supreme Court of Suriname

Foreign relations of Suriname 

Foreign relations of Suriname
 Diplomatic missions in Suriname
 Diplomatic missions of Suriname

International organization membership 
The Republic of Suriname is a member of:

African, Caribbean, and Pacific Group of States (ACP)
Agency for the Prohibition of Nuclear Weapons in Latin America and the Caribbean (OPANAL)
Caribbean Community and Common Market (Caricom)
Food and Agriculture Organization (FAO)
Group of 77 (G77)
Inter-American Development Bank (IADB)
International Bank for Reconstruction and Development (IBRD)
International Civil Aviation Organization (ICAO)
International Criminal Court (ICCt)
International Criminal Police Organization (Interpol)
International Federation of Red Cross and Red Crescent Societies (IFRCS)
International Fund for Agricultural Development (IFAD)
International Hydrographic Organization (IHO) (suspended)
International Labour Organization (ILO)
International Maritime Organization (IMO)
International Monetary Fund (IMF)
International Olympic Committee (IOC)
International Organization for Standardization (ISO) (subscriber)
International Red Cross and Red Crescent Movement (ICRM)
International Telecommunication Union (ITU)
International Trade Union Confederation (ITUC)

Inter-Parliamentary Union (IPU)
Islamic Development Bank (IDB)
Latin American Economic System (LAES)
Multilateral Investment Guarantee Agency (MIGA)
Nonaligned Movement (NAM)
Organisation of Islamic Cooperation (OIC)
Organisation for the Prohibition of Chemical Weapons (OPCW)
Organization of American States (OAS)
Permanent Court of Arbitration (PCA)
Union of South American Nations (UNASUR)
United Nations (UN)
United Nations Conference on Trade and Development (UNCTAD)
United Nations Educational, Scientific, and Cultural Organization (UNESCO)
United Nations Industrial Development Organization (UNIDO)
Universal Postal Union (UPU)
World Confederation of Labour (WCL)
World Federation of Trade Unions (WFTU)
World Health Organization (WHO)
World Intellectual Property Organization (WIPO)
World Meteorological Organization (WMO)
World Trade Organization (WTO)

Law and order in Suriname 

Law of Suriname
 Capital punishment in Suriname
 Constitution of Suriname
 Crime in Suriname
 Human rights in Suriname
 LGBT rights in Suriname
 Law enforcement in Suriname

Military of Suriname 

Military of Suriname
 Command
 Commander-in-chief:
 Forces
 Army of Suriname
 Air Force of Suriname

Local government in Suriname 

Local government in Suriname

History of Suriname 

History of Suriname
 Timeline of the history of Suriname
 Current events of Suriname

Culture of Suriname 

Culture of Suriname
 Cuisine of Suriname
 Languages of Suriname
 National symbols of Suriname
 Coat of arms of Suriname
 Flag of Suriname
 National anthem of Suriname
 People of Suriname
 Prostitution in Suriname
 Public holidays in Suriname
 Religion in Suriname
 Christianity in Suriname
 Hinduism in Suriname
 Islam in Suriname
 World Heritage Sites in Suriname

Art in Suriname 

 Music of Suriname

Sports in Suriname 

Sports in Suriname
 Football in Suriname
 Suriname at the Olympics

Economy and infrastructure of Suriname 

Economy of Suriname
 Economic rank, by nominal GDP (2007): 154th (one hundred and fifty fourth)
 Agriculture in Suriname
 Communications in Suriname
 Internet in Suriname
 Companies of Suriname
Currency of Suriname: Dollar
ISO 4217: SRD
 Transport in Suriname
 Airports in Suriname
 Rail transport in Suriname

Education in Suriname 

Education in Suriname

See also 

Suriname
List of Suriname-related topics
List of international rankings
Member state of the United Nations
Outline of South America
List of place names of Dutch origin

References

External links 

 Government of the Republic of Suriname 
 Big database of Suriname websites 
 Business in Suriname Database
 
 Suriname. The World Factbook. Central Intelligence Agency.
 
 
 Perry–Castañeda Library Map Collection

Suriname
 1